Dito Telecommunity Corporation (stylized as DITO), formerly known as Mindanao Islamic Telephone Company, Inc. or Mislatel is a telecommunications company in the Philippines which is also engaged in the business of multimedia and information technology. It is a consortium of Davao businessman Dennis Uy's Udenna Corporation (through its subsidiary Dito CME Holdings Corporation), and Chinese state-owned China Telecommunications Corporation, a parent company of China Telecom.

The consortium is known as the sole winner of the government-sanctioned bidding that would allow the consortium to become the third major telecommunications provider in the Philippines challenging the duopoly of PLDT and Globe Telecom. Dito CME Holdings Corporation (a publicly listed firm also owned by Uy), meanwhile, has an "indirect ownership" in the telco.

Dito Telecommunity began its commercial operations on March 8, 2021. As of February 2023, Dito's total mobile subscriber base reached 13.1 million. Dito gave out a free data allocation of 1 gigabyte for each subscriber when it hit a million customers three months after its official rollout.

History

Early years as Mislatel
The Dito Telecommunity's history can be traced back to the establishment of Mindanao Islamic Telephone Company, Inc. (Mislatel), which is enacted by Congressional legislation on April 19, 1998, under Republic Act No. 8627, allowing the franchise to construct, install, establish, operate and maintain a telecommunication system throughout the Philippines.

Third major telecommunications provider bid

In 2018, it was announced that Mislatel was one of the telecommunication firms to join the government-sanctioned bidding allowing the winner to become the third major telco provider in the Philippines challenging the duopoly of PLDT and Globe. Mislatel became a joint-consortium between Udenna Corporation, its subsidiary Chelsea Logistics, and Chinese state-owned and a parent company of China Telecom, China Telecommunications Corporation. The consortium was finally named as the "provisional third major player" by the NTC, beating out two other firms, Sear Telecom consortium and PT&T in the bidding.

The Senate and the House of Representatives approved the transfer of ownership of Mislatel to the latter's consortium. In June 2019, the consortium's stakeholders completed a share-purchase agreement with Mislatel, and were then awaiting their permit to operate, tentatively by July 2019.

The consortium paid a ₱25.7 billion performance bond to the government as it committed to provide internet service with a speed of 200 megabits per second to more than a third of the population on its first year of operation.

Relaunch as Dito

On July 8, 2019, Mislatel was renamed as Dito Telecommunity. Dito was derived from the Filipino word for "here", which is a response to the stakeholders' question on where they plan to set up a firm that would provide a "world class service" with "here" referring to the Philippines, the country where Dito Telecommunity is based in.

At the same date of the announcement of the company's renaming, Dito Telecommunity was granted its permit to operate after Philippine President Rodrigo Duterte awarded the Certificate of Public Convenience and Necessity by the National Telecommunications Commission to its chairman Dennis Uy during a ceremony at the Presidential Palace, Malacañang.

On September 6, 2019, Dito announced its plans to build its own campus on an  lot at Clark Global City. The campus will house the company's own data center and will hold Dito's operational departments, network operations center, servecall center, and regional center. It will also serve as the hub for Dito's research and development in the telecommunications space. Dito began the construction of its campus on April 13, 2021.

In October 2019, Dito signed separate deals with Lopez-owned Sky Cable Corporation and politician Luis Chavit Singson's LCS Group. Under the deal with LCS Group, Dito will lease the shared telco towers that LCS had already build in several areas. While on the other hand of the deal with Sky Cable, Dito will utilize the latter's unused fiber-optic cables in Metro Manila.

By March 2020, two months ahead of schedule, the first domestic and international calls from the company's network were made. On July 18, 2020, the company had its technical launch. The technical launch means that the Dito network will be ready for technical audits from the National Telecommunications Commission (NTC). The company passed its first technical audit in February 2021. As of September 2020, Dito has completed 859 cell sites out of the planned 1,600 sites that will cover 37% of the population.

On February 23, 2021, Dito and PLDT signed an interconnection deal to enable subscribers from the two companies to communicate in their respective networks. Dito and Globe Telecom also signed an interconnetion deal on February 24, 2021.

Start of operations
The company began its commercial operations on March 8, 2021, in select 15 selected areas in Visayas and Mindanao particularly in Metro Cebu and Metro Davao. Dito decided to focus on the rollout of its mobile services first. Dito had offered the 4G LTE first before moving to 5G technology in 2021.

On April 16, 2021, Dito expanded its services to select areas in Luzon provinces, initially in five provinces covering a total of 18 cities and municipalities.

On May 17, 2021, Dito service became available in Metro Manila. On May 18, 2021, President Duterte signed Republic Act No. 11537 which renewed Dito's license for another 25 years. The law granted Dito a franchise to construct, establish, install, maintain and operate wire and/or wireless telecommunications systems in the Philippines. On May 26, 2021, Dito selected Nokia to deploy its 5G services in Mindanao.

On June 29, 2021, Dito announced that it has partnered with non-banking financial firm M Lhuillier to expand the reach of the former's products and services nationwide.

By 2022, Dito intends to offer high-speed broadband internet service. Additionally, the company has prioritized Mindanao and the Visayas for the commercial launch of their upcoming broadband services. But on February 28, 2022, Dito launches its pilot broadband in Metro Manila instead.

As of January 15, 2023, the service is currently available in 56 out of 82 provinces in the country: 31 in Luzon, 10 in Visayas and 15 in Mindanao.

Controversies

Complaint against Globe Telecom and Smart Communications 
On August 8, 2022, Dito Telecommunity filed a complaint against duopolies Globe Telecom and Smart Communications at the Philippine Competition Commission for an alleged "anti-competitive practices" and "abuse of market dominance".

Ownership
The following stockholders of Dito Telecommunity (as of November 2020):

Radio frequency summary

LTE Carrier Aggregation Combination Bands:

LTE B1 (2100 MHz) and LTE B28 (700 MHz) CA_1A_28A

DITO is the first commercial network in the Philippines to launch 5G in Standalone Mode (SA 5G) and will soon launch Voice over NR (VoNR) Services.

See also
Dito CME Holdings Corporation
China Telecommunications Corporation

References

External links 
Official website

Telecommunications companies of the Philippines
Mobile phone companies of the Philippines
Telecommunications companies established in 1998
1998 establishments in the Philippines
Udenna Corporation